The Cairo edition ("the Amiri Mus'haf"), or the King Fu'ād Quran or the Azhar Quran, is an edition of the Quran printed by the Amiri Press in the Bulaq district of Cairo on July 10, 1924. It is the first printed Quran to be accepted by a Muslim authority—Al-Azhar.

The process of creating the Fu'ad Quran lasted 17 years, from 1907 to 1924, achieved with the support by Fuad I of Egypt and the supervision of Azhari scholars. It was regarded as an "official" Quran and was replicated by a number of following editions.

History 
A committee of leading professors from Al-Azhar University had started work on the project in 1907 but it was not until 10 July 1924 that the "Cairo Qur’an" was first published by Amiri Press under the patronage of Fuad I of Egypt, as such, it is sometimes known as the "royal (amīriyya) edition." The goal of the government of the newly formed Kingdom of Egypt was not to delegitimize the other qir’at, but to eliminate that, which the colophon labels as errors, found in Qur’anic texts used in state schools. To do this they chose to preserve one of the fourteen Qira'at “readings”, namely that of Hafs (d. 180/796), student of ‘Asim. Its publication has been called a "terrific success", and the edition has been described as one "now widely seen as the official text of the Qur’an", so popular among both Sunni and Shi'a that the common belief among less well-informed Muslims is "that the Qur’an has a single, unambiguous reading", i.e. that of the 1924 Cairo version. Minor amendments were made later in 1924 and in 1936 - the "Faruq edition" in honour of then ruler, King Faruq.

Reasons given for the overwhelming popularity of Hafs and Asim range from the fact that it is easy to recite, to the simple statement that "God has chosen it". Ingrid Mattson credits mass-produced printing press mushafs with increasing the availability of the written Quran but also diminishing the diversity of qira'at. Written text has become canonical and oral recitation has lost much of its previous equality.

Muslim disagreement over whether to include the Basmala within the Quranic text, reached consensus following the 1924 Edition, which included it as the first verse (āyah) of Quran chapter 1 but otherwise included it as an unnumbered line of text preceding the other relevant 112 chapters. The Cairo Quran adopted the Kufan tradition of separating and numbering verses, and thus standardized a different verse numbering to Flügel's 1834 edition. It adopted the chronological order of chapters attributed to Ibn Abbās, which became widely accepted following 1924. A large number of pre-1924 Qurans were destroyed by dumping them in the river Nile.

Prominent committee members included Islamic scholar, Muhammad b. ‘Ali al-Husayni al-Haddad, Egypt's senior Qur'an Reader (Shaykh al-Maqâri). Noteworthy Western scholars/academics working in Egypt during the era include Bergsträsser and Jeffery. Methodological differences aside, speculation alludes to a spirit of cooperation. Bergsträsser was certainly impressed with the work.

References 

Amiri Press publications
Quran
1924 books